The 2008 United Kingdom local elections were held on 1 May 2008. These elections took place in 137 English Local Authorities and all Welsh Councils.

There were also extraordinary elections held for four of the new unitary authorities being created, in Northumberland, County Durham and Cheshire (two councils – Cheshire East and Cheshire West and Chester). Scheduled elections for Penwith in Cornwall, Shrewsbury and Atcham in Shropshire, Bedford and South Bedfordshire in Bedfordshire and five district councils in Cheshire were cancelled, due to the up-coming unitary authorities being established in those counties.

The Labour Party finished in 3rd place by vote share, trailing the Conservatives by 20%, the largest such margin ever between the two main parties. Aside from the strong showing for David Cameron's Conservatives, Plaid Cymru and the Lib Dems each made net gains of over 30 seats and the BNP made 10 net gains to finish with over 30 seats.

The strong showing for the Conservatives and the disappointing showing by Labour reflected the change in the political mood of Britain at the time, where the Labour government, now led by prime minister Gordon Brown, had suffered a slump in popularity due to the financial crisis and economic fears which were affecting Britain at the time.

Summary of results

England

Metropolitan boroughs
All 36 English metropolitan borough councils had one third of their seats up for election.

Unitary authorities

Existing councils
In 19 English unitary authorities one third of the council was up for election.

New councils
Elections were held in three of the current non-metropolitan counties of Cheshire, County Durham and Northumberland for four new unitary authorities which were established in 2009. These councils were "shadow councils" until then.

District councils

Whole council
In 4 English district authorities the whole council was up for election following ward boundary changes.

Half of council
In 7 English district authorities, half of the council was up for election.

Third of council
In 67 English district authorities, a third of the council was up for election.

Mayoral elections

Wales

In all 22 Welsh councils the whole of the council was up for election.

See also
2008 London Mayoral election
2008 London Assembly election

References

 
2008
2008 elections in the United Kingdom